Fairytales is the second album by Norwegian pop singer Bambee, released in 2001 (see 2001 in music). The track "Seventeen" is featured in the video game Dance Dance Revolution 5thMIX, and the track "Cowgirl" is featured in DDRMAX: Dance Dance Revolution 6thMIX.

Track listing

References

External links 
 

2001 albums
Bambee albums